The Emmanuel Gallery is an art gallery and historic building at 1205 10th Street in Denver, Colorado, United States, on the Auraria Campus.

The gallery is housed in Denver's oldest surviving church building and is listed on the National Register of Historic Places as Emmanuel Shearith Israel Chapel. It was built in 1876 as an Episcopal church, on the site of a Sunday School building that was erected in 1859. In 1903, it was bought by the Shearith Israel congregation and converted to serve as a Jewish synagogue, which it was until 1958.

It was the first official Denver landmark established by ordnance of Denver's city council, on January 10, 1968.

The building was listed on the National Register of Historic Places in 1969.

It has served as an art gallery since 1973.

References

External links
 
 Emmanuel Gallery website

Churches completed in 1876
Churches in Denver
Synagogues on the National Register of Historic Places in Colorado
Synagogues completed in 1903
Art museums and galleries in Colorado
Properties of religious function on the National Register of Historic Places in Colorado
Synagogues in Denver
19th-century Episcopal church buildings
1876 establishments in Colorado
Former synagogues in the United States